Hugo Leal Melo da Silva (born 6 August 1962) more commonly known as Hugo Leal is a Brazilian politician as well as a syndicalist and trade union president. Although born in Minas Gerais, he has spent his political career representing Rio de Janeiro, having served as federal deputy representative since 2007.

Personal life
Leal is the son of Leal Pereira da Silva e Vicentina de Paula Pereira da Silva. Prior to entering politics he was lawyer and real estate brooker. Leal is a Roman Catholic and member of a Catholic Parliamentary Front which campaigns against abortion on other issues.

Political career
Leal voted in favor of the impeachment motion of then-president Dilma Rousseff. He would later vote against opening a similar corruption investigation against Rousseff's successor Michel Temer, and voted in favor of the 2017 Brazilian labor reforms.

Despite his religion Leal has often campaigned with the evangelical parliamentary group on issues the two agree on. Leal is a strong supporter of limiting government involvement and regulations in the economy.

References

1962 births
Living people
People from Ouro Fino
Brazilian Roman Catholics
Democratic Labour Party (Brazil) politicians
Brazilian Socialist Party politicians
Social Christian Party (Brazil) politicians
Republican Party of the Social Order politicians
Social Democratic Party (Brazil, 2011) politicians
Members of the Chamber of Deputies (Brazil) from Rio de Janeiro (state)
Members of the Legislative Assembly of Rio de Janeiro
20th-century Brazilian lawyers